X Multimedia System (XMMS) is an audio player for Unix-like systems released under a free software license.

History
XMMS was originally written as X11Amp by Peter and Mikael Alm in November 1997. The player was made to resemble Winamp, which was first released in May that year. As such, XMMS has supported Winamp 2 "classic" skins since its release. Though the original release was made under a license that did not provide any access to the program's source code, it is now released under the GPL-2.0-or-later.

On June 10, 1999, 4Front Technologies decided to sponsor X11Amp development and the project was renamed to XMMS - the name being an acronym for X MultiMedia System. Most XMMS users take this to mean "X11 MultiMedia System" or "X Window System MultiMedia System"; the official interpretation of the "X" is "Cross-platform".

In 2002, Peter Alm initiated the XMMS2 project, aiming to produce a successor to XMMS using all new code and devoted solely to audio playback.

Forks
XMMS has continued to use GTK+ 1.x toolkit, despite the current version being GTK 4. The primary reason for this reluctance to upgrade is that many XMMS plugins (written by third parties) are dependent on the older version of GTK+ to properly function, e.g., "about" boxes and configuration dialogs. Many software developers also consider the XMMS codebase to be poorly designed and difficult to maintain. These factors led to various forks and related projects:

 The Beep Media Player, a fork of XMMS code that uses GTK+ 2, started around 2003
 Youki, the remade continuation of Beep Media Player, started around the end of 2005
 Audacious, a fork from Beep Media Player started around 2005 when Beep Media Player development ceased in favor of Youki
 A GTK+2 based fork by Mohammed Sameer, named XMMS2. It is unrelated to the current XMMS2 project, which uses a new codebase and client/server architecture not derived from XMMS.

Features

XMMS currently supports the following audio and video file formats:
AAC support is provided by the FAAD2 library, supporting m4a files
APE Monkey's Audio Codec .ape files — support provided by the mac-port project plugin
Audio CD, including CDDB via FreeDB lookup
FLAC support is provided by a plugin in the FLAC library
Icecast and SHOUTcast streaming supported, and is compatible with Winamp 2 skins.
libmikmod supported formats (including .XM, .MOD, .IT)  See: MikMod's Home
JACK plug-in for support of the JACK Audio Connection Kit.
ModPlug plug-in for playing .MOD, .S3M, .XM, .IT and other famous tracker formats. 
mp3PRO support is provided by a third party plugin (which does not support SHOUTcast title streaming)
MPEG Layer 1,2 and 3 (Also known as MP3), using the mpg123 library
Musepack support using XMMS-Musepack plugin.
OGG Vorbis support is provided by a plug-in provided by xiph.org
SHN support is provided by a plug-in provided by etree.
speex high quality & ratio speech compression format via plugin
TTA support is provided by a third party plugin
UADE plug-in provides support for most Amiga music formats
WAV
WavPack with support provided by a third party plugin
WMA Limited support provided by third party plugin.

Skins

XMMS has a default skin provided, but it is also possible to use any WSZ classic skins to enhance the graphic attractiveness of the player. (see attached image)

Coverviewer

xmms-coverviewer is an XMMS plugin which allows XMMS to display album art and further enhance the graphical interface of the player. (see attached image)

References

External links

Audio player software that uses GTK
Audio software with JACK support
Free audio software
Free media players
Free software programmed in C
Linux media players